Andriy Lyubka (born 3 December 1987 in Riga, Latvia) is a Ukrainian poet, essayist, and translator. He grew up in Vynohradiv, in South-Western Ukraine, and then enrolled at the Uzhhorod National University, where he studied Ukrainian Philology. His second master's degree in Balkan Studies was received from Warsaw University in 2014. Lyubka currently lives in Uzhhorod.

Literary work 
Lyubka is the author of four collections of poetry, one book of short stories, Saudade, and six novels. His novel Carbide depicts the daily life of smugglers in Zakarpattia Oblast.
He also  translates prose and poetry from Polish, Serbian, Bosnian, Croatian, and English.  Additionally, he is a columnist for  Ukrainian and European journals, Newspapers and media outlets, Nowa Europa Wschodnia / New Eastern Europe, Radio Free Europe/Radio Liberty, Den'''', zbruc.eu, and kontrakty.ua,

 Publications 
 Poetry 
 Eight Months of Schizophrenia (Вісім місяців шизофренії). Uzhhorod 2007.
 Terrorism (ТЕРОРИЗМ). Uzhhorod 2008.
 Forty Bucks Plus Tip (Сорок баксів плюс чайові). Chernivtsi 2012.
 Notaufnahme. German transl. of poems by Team.BAES-low-lectured. BAES, Innsbruck 2012.
 (together with DJ Dimka Special-K) Before the explosion we will kiss (Перед вибухом поцілуємося). 2012.

 Prose 
 Killer (КІЛЕР. Збірка історій). Lviv, Piramida, 2012. 2nd augm. edition Killer+. Knyhy-XXI / Meridian Czernowitz 2018.
 Killer. Transl. by Bohdan Zadura. Biuro literackie, Wroclaw 2013.
 Sleeping with women (Спати з жінками). Chernivtsi, Knyhy-XXI / Meridian Czernowitz 2014.
 Karbid. Chernivtsi, Knyhy-XXI / Meridian Czernowitz 2015.
 Karbid. Polish Transl. by Bohdan Zadura. Warsztaty Kułtury, Lublin 2016.
 Carbide. English Transl. by Reilly Costigan-Humes and Isaac Stackhouse Wheeler. London 2020.
 Karbidas. Lithuanian Transl. by Donata Rinkevičienė. Sofoklis. Vilnius 2021
 A Room for Sorrow (Кімната для печалі). Chernivtsi, Knyhy-XXI / Meridian Czernowitz 2016.
 Pokój do smutku. Polish Transl. by Bohdan Zadura. Lublin 2018.
 Saudade (Саудаде). Chernivtsi, Knyhy-XXI / Meridian Czernowitz 2017.
 Your glance, Cio-Cio-San (Твій погляд, Чіо-Чіо-сан)? Knyhy-XXI / Meridian Czernowitz 2018.

Lyubka's prose and poetry has been translated into Chinese, Czech, Dutch, English, German, Lithuanian, Macedonian, Polish, Portuguese, Romanian, Russian, Serbian, Slovak, and Turkish.

 Book translations 
Translations from Polish
 Bohdan Zadura, Night life (Ukrainian title: Нічне життя). Piramida, Lviv (2012)
 Bohdan Zadura, Worst behind (Ukrainian title: Найгірше позаду). Knyhy-XXI, Chernivtsi (2015)
 Lidia Ostałowska, Farby wodne (Ukrainian title: Акварелі). Knyhy-XXI, Chernivtsi (2014)

Translation from Serbian
 Srđan Valjarevič, Комо. Knyhy-XXI, Chernivtsi (2016)
 Svetislav Basara, The Cyclist Conspiracy (Ukrainian title: Фама про велесопедистів). Knyhy-XXI, Chernivtsi (2017)

Translation from Bosnian
 Muahrem Bazdulj, Konzert. Knyhy-XXI, Chernivtsi (2018)

Articles in English
 In Search of Barbarians, in: Issue 6/2016 of New Eastern Europe, pp. 21–28, also online
 Has the war really changed Ukrainians?, in: Issue 5/2017 of New Eastern Europe, pp. 63–69.
 A barbarian in the besieged city, in: Issue 5/2018 of New Eastern Europe, pp. 63–69, also online

Interviews
 Russia is the problem (in German)
 I am atheist - for me death is the end (in Ukrainian)
 Vogue Interview from 03. Dezember 2016, also online
 Literature supports us in a way, in: Apofenie 16. September 2018, online

 Curator 
 Curator of Kyiv Laurels, an international poetry festival (Kyiv, Ukraine)
 Curator of Meridian Czernowitz, an international poetry festival (Chernivtsi, Ukraine)

 Writer in residence 
Lyubka has been writer-in-residence at cultural institutes in Poland, Latvia, Romania, Hungary, Sweden and Austria. In 2017 he received the CEI Fellowship for writers in Fellowship and stayed in Slovenia.

 Awards 
 Yuri Shevelov Award of the Ukrainian PEN Club for Saudade (2017)
 Kovaliv Foundation literary prize (2017)
 Kyiv Laurels (2011)
 Debut (2007)

 Secondary literature 
 P. M. Khodanych, Art. Lyubka, Andriy, in: Encyclopedia of Modern Ukraine vol. 18 (2017) p. 306,  also online
 Reilly Costigan-Humes, Ukrainian Literature's Boy Wonder Goes West, in: The Odessa Review'' January Issue 2018, also online

References

External links 
 
 Biography of Andriy Lyubka at PEN International (Ukrainian branch) website
 Biography
 Literary Event: "Smuggling Ukraine Westward: A conversation with Ukrainian writer Andriy Lyubka" , at the Munk School of Global Affairs, University of Toronto, November 7, 2017, uploaded by the Ukrainian Jewish Encounter
 Contemporary Ukrainian Literature Series: “Smuggling Ukraine Westward”, Woodrow Wilson Center, upl. 13.10.2017
 Andriy Lyubka: Rediscovering Ukraine - Ukrainian Cultural Heritage Village, Canadian Institute of Slavic Studies, upl. 22.08.2018
 

Ukrainian essayists
Ukrainian male writers
People from Vynohradiv
1987 births
Ukrainian poets
Male essayists
Ukrainian translators
Living people